The Gracchi brothers were two Roman brothers, sons of Tiberius Sempronius Gracchus who was consul in 177 BC. Tiberius, the elder brother, was tribune of the plebs in 133 BC and Gaius, the younger brother, was tribune a decade later in 123–122 BC.

They attempted to redistribute the ager publicus – the public land hitherto controlled principally by aristocrats – to the  rural plebs and military veterans, in addition to other social and constitutional reforms. After achieving some early success, both were assassinated by the Optimates, the conservative faction in the Senate that opposed these reforms.

Early lives 

Their father was the elderly Tiberius Sempronius Gracchus, who had served as tribune of the plebs, praetor, consul, and censor. Their mother was Cornelia, daughter of Scipio Africanus, himself considered a hero by the Roman people for his part in the war against Carthage. Their parents had 12 children; only one daughter – who later married Scipio Aemilianus – and two sons, Tiberius and Gaius, survived to adulthood.

After the boys' father died while they were young, responsibility for their education fell to their mother. Cornelia ensured that the brothers had the best available Greek tutors, teaching them oratory and political science. The brothers were also well trained in martial pursuits: in horsemanship and combat they outshone all their peers. The older brother, Tiberius, was  – according to the historian J. C. Stobart, had he taken the easy path rather than the cause of radical reform, he would have been clearly destined for consulship. Tiberius was a distinguished young officer in the Third Punic War, Rome's last campaign against Carthage. He was the  As the boys grew up, they developed strong connections with the ruling elite.

Tribunates

Tiberius 

According to the historian J. C. Stobart, had Tiberius taken the easy path rather than the cause of radical reform, he would have been clearly destined for consulship. 

Tiberius was a distinguished young officer in the Third Punic War: Tiberius, along with Gaius Fannius, was among the first to scale Carthage's walls. He was later elected as quaestor and served in the Numantine war under Gaius Hostilius Mancinus. During the campaign, when the Roman army had been surrounded, he negotiated a treaty – later rejected by the senate – in which he received terms of safe passage for the army from Numantine territory.

Tiberius, with the support of many influential senators, was successful in passing land reform legislation that established a commission to distribute public land to the rural plebs. His stubbornness and refusal to compromise may have been motivated by the senatorial rebuff of his negotiations after the Numantine affair. He, however, broke substantial political norms in the tactics – deposing a tribune, trampling on the senate's authority, etc – used to pass the laws. These political tactics were the main focus of backlash, rather than his land reform law, which survived his death. When he stood for consecutive re-election, his first cousin, Publius Cornelius Scipio Nasica Corculum, led a mob which beat him to death during the electoral comitia. This opposition was political: Gracchus' land reforms "may have been acceptable", but not when combined with his seeming threats "to make the urban populace and the small peasants his personal clientelae".

Gaius 

Gaius Gracchus served in the Roman army under Scipio Aemilianus during the campaign against Numantia starting in 133 BC. He may have held the military tribunate during his service there. During his elder brother Tiberius' tribunate, he started his political career with election as a commissioner in the Gracchan land commission to distribute public land to poor families.

He was elected to the tribunate of 123 BC, a decade after his brother's tribunate. He was also successful in achieving re-election and therefore also served in the tribunate of 122 BC. He proposed many laws during his first year, to:

 bar deposed magistrates from standing for office, which was withdrawn at his mother's request,
 reaffirm compulsory appeal to the people in capital cases,
 create a state-subsidised grain supply,
 re-affirm Tiberius' agricultural laws,
 codify the terms of military service,
 establish tax farming in Asia,
 require the senate to determine consular provincial assignments before consular elections,
 authorise the construction of granaries, roads, and other public works,
 establish new Roman colonies at Scolacium and Tarentum,
 incorporate equites into the juries of the permanent courts, which likely failed,
 further restrict judicial bribery, and
 to levy new customs duties.

In his second year, he brought proposals to:

 require juries of equites in the permanent corruption courts,
 give citizenship and Latin rights to the Latins and Italians, respectively, and
 require a random order of voting in the Centuriate Assembly.

His Italian citizenship bills, along with those on voting reform, failed, revealing his waning popularity. He was then defeated when standing for re-election. In the next year, a consul was elected who opposed Gracchus' legislation. He exploited the unrest associated with protests against repeal of the laws on equestrian juries and reestablishment of a colony at Carthage to have martial law declared via the senatus consultum ultimum. He then proceeded to suppress Gracchus, his ally Marcus Fulvius Flaccus, and other supporters by force.

Reasons for failure
According to the classicist J. C. Stobart, Tiberius's Greek education had caused him to overestimate the reliability of the people as a power base, causing him to overplay his hand. In Rome, even when led by a bold tribune, the people enjoyed much less influence than at the height of the Athenian democracy. Another problem for Gaius's aims was that  to prevent any one individual governing for a sustained period of time – and there were several other checks and balances to prevent power being concentrated on any one person. Stobart adds that another reason for the failure was the Gracchi's idealism: they were deaf to the baser notes of human nature and failed to recognize how corrupt and selfish all sections of Roman society had become.

Historian Michael Crawford attributes the disappearance of much of Tiberius Gracchus' support to the reduced level of citizen participation due to dispersal far from Rome, and sees his tribunate as marking a step in the Hellenization of the Roman aristocracy. Crawford asserts that Gaius Gracchus' extortion law shifted the balance of power in Rome and that the Gracchi made available a new political armoury which the oligarchy subsequently sought to exploit.

Aftermath

The impact of Tiberius' murder started a cycle of increased aristocratic violence to suppress popular movements: "the oligarchy had introduced violence into the political system with the murder of Tiberius Gracchus and over the years the use of violence became increasingly acceptable as various political disputes in Rome led to more and more bloody discord". The use of force to suppress reform also suggested that the republic itself was temperamentally unsuited for producing the types of economic reforms wanted or needed, as in Gracchus' framing, by the people. 

In terms of periodisation, the death of Tiberius Gracchus in 133 BC is viewed as the start of a new period in the Roman republic, one in which political violence was normalised. For example, in The Cambridge Companion to the Roman Republic, Jürgen von Ungern-Sternberg writes:

Even in ancient times, Cicero remarked as much in saying "the death of Tiberius Gracchus, and even before that the whole rationale behind his tribunate, divided a united people into two distinct groups" (though Beard also warns against this as a "rhetorical oversimplification": "the idea there had been a calm consensus at Rome between rich and poor until [133 BC] is at best a nostalgic fiction").

Notes

References

Sources

External links

Translation of Book 1 of The Civil Wars by Appian
Tiberius Gracchus (168–133 BCE) by Hugh Last (BTM format)
T Gracchi, Marius and Sulla by A. H. Beesly (BTM format)

2nd-century BC Romans
Brother duos
Populares
Tribunes of the plebs
Sempronii